The Greeks in Kazakhstan are mainly the descendants of Pontic Greeks who were deported there by Joseph Stalin, from southern Russia and the Caucasus region, at first the Crimean Greeks on 1944, under the resolution 5984 of June 2, 1944. then the Caucasus (Greeks in Georgia and Greeks in Armenia, Greeks in Azerbaijan) Greeks in June 1949, Feb 1950, Aug 1950. The total number of deported persons was about 60,000 people.

Nowadays there are between 10 and 12 thousand ethnic Greeks living in Kazakhstan in 17 communities, which together with the Kyrgyzstan community make up the FILIA (friendship in Greek) Federation of Greek Communities of Kazakhstan and Kyrgyzstan. The Federation prints a small newspaper, organizes dance events, and offers Greek language and dance classes. At the moment in Kazakhstan there are 6 ethnic Greek teachers funded by the General Secretariat of Greeks Abroad. Furthermore, Greek is taught by two teachers seconded from Greece.

Notable people
Charalambos Cholidis, Greek Olympic wrestler
Aleksandr Khapsalis, retired Soviet football player
Evstaphiy Pechlevanidis, retired Soviet and Greek professional football player
Savvas Kofidis, Greek former football player and football coach
Ilya Ilyin, weightlifter (Greek Pontian maternal grandfather, Iakovos Fountoukidis)

See also
 Greek diaspora
 Greece–Kazakhstan relations
 Demographics of Kazakhstan
 Greeks in Uzbekistan
 Greeks in Kyrgyzstan

References

Ethnic groups in Kazakhstan
European diaspora in Kazakhstan
Kazakhstan
Greece–Kazakhstan relations